Snowshoe Lake is a lake in the Lake Huron drainage basin in Kearney, Almaguin Highlands, Parry Sound, Ontario, Canada. The primary inflow is an unnamed creek from Ink Lake, and the primary outflow is an unnamed creek to Cripple Lake, which flows via Cripple Creek, the Big East River, the Muskoka River and the Moon and  Musquash rivers into Lake Huron.

See also
List of lakes in Ontario

References

Lakes of Parry Sound District